Tetyana Ptashkina (Cyrillic: Тетяна Пташкіна; born 10 January 1993) is a Ukrainian athlete whose specialty is the triple jump. She competed at the 2015 World Championships in Beijing without qualifying for the final. Her personal bests in the event are 14.08 metres outdoors (+1.1 m/s, Tallinn 2015) and 13.67 metres indoors (Sumy 2015).

Competition record

References

External links
 

1993 births
Living people
Ukrainian female triple jumpers
World Athletics Championships athletes for Ukraine
Sportspeople from Luhansk